The Interim National Government was the government of Nigeria following the crisis of the Third Republic after General Ibrahim Babangida handed power over to Ernest Shonekan as interim Head of State on 27 August 1993. The largely powerless government was dissolved when General Sani Abacha seized power on 17 November 1993.

History

12 June 1993 presidential election was won by Moshood Abiola. 
General Babangida annulled the election.
This led to rioting, particularly in the south, which was harshly suppressed.
Babangida announced that he would step down on 26 August 1993, and handed over to Ernest Shonekan as head of the Interim National Government (ING) on 27 August 1993.
Shoenkan had a degree in law, had studied at the Harvard Business School in the US, and had held senior management positions in various companies. He was an Oloye of the Yoruba people and had been president of Babangida's Transitional Council. He was an unelected technocrat chosen in a deal between Babangida and political leaders, and his appointment was poorly received by the press and the public.

Shonekan appointed Moshood Abiola as his vice-president.
General Sani Abacha was made secretary of defence in the cabinet.
Under the ING the country suffered runaway inflation and saw strikes by workers in various sectors.
Most foreign investors withdrew apart from oil companies.
Shonekan made efforts to have government debt forgiven. He drew up a timetable for return to democracy and for withdrawal of Nigeria's contingent from the ECOMOG preackeeping force in Liberia. He also launched an audit of the Nigerian National Petroleum Corporation, the largest oil company, and tried to restore civil liberties.
Shonekan managed to remove laws that allowed arbitrary arrest and confiscation of property, promoted press freedom, obtained the release of some political prisoners and made reforms to the corrupt public services and state-owned companies.

No clear process was given for holding fresh elections, and there was general political uncertainty under the Shonekan government.
The ING faced media campaigns against the delay in returning to democracy and the continued involvement of the military in politics. 
The government was opposed by pro-democracy activists, civil society organisations, labour unions and students. 
The Lagos high court nullified Shonekan's appointment and called for Abiola to be sworn in as the elected candidate for the presidency.
General Sani Abacha forced Shonekan to resign on 17 November 1993, and as the most senior military officer took over as head of state.

Ministers
The ministers initially announced were:

Vice-President: Moshood Abiola
Defense: General Aliyu Mohammed Gusau
Abuja: Lieutenant General Gado Nasko
Agriculture: Jerry Gana
Communications: Dapo Sarumi
Education: Abraham Imogie
Energy: Donald Etiebet
Finance: Aminu Saleh
Foreign Affairs: Chief Matthew Mbu
Health and Human Service: Adelusi Adeluyi
Industry: Chief Ignatius Kogbara
Information: Uche Chukwumerije
Interior: E. S. Yusufu
Labor: Bola Afonja
Power: Hassan Adamu
Trade: Kuforiji Olubi
Transportation: Bashir Dalhatu

The final list of members was:

Head of State: Chief Ernest Shonekan
Defence Secretary: Gen. Sani Abacha
Secretary of State (Defence): Alhaji Umaru Baba
Agriculture/Natural Resources: Prof. Jerry Gana
Commerce/Tourism: Chief Mrs. Kuforiji Olubi
Communications: Chief Dapo Sarumi
Education and Youth Development: Prof. Abraham Imogie
Finance: Alhaji Aminu Saleh
FCT Administrator: Maj.Gen. Gado Nasko
Foreign Affairs: Chief Matthew Mbu
Secretary of State (Foreign): Alhaji Saidu Isa
Health and Human Services: Prince Adelusi Adeluyi
Internal Affairs: Chief Ezekiel Yesufu
Industries: Chief Ignatius Kogbara
Information and Culture: Mr. Uche Chukwumerije
Justice: Mr. Clement Akpamgbo SAN
Petroleum/Mineral Resources: Chief Donald Etiebet
Secretary of State (Petroleum): Alhaji Ibrahim Al
Labour and Productivity: Prince Bola Afonja
Power and Steel: Alhaji Hassan Adamu
Secretary of State (Power and Steel): Alhaji Oladunni Ayandipo
Police Affairs: Alhaji Abdullahi Mahmud Koki
Science and Technology: Prof. Bartholomew Nnaji
Transport/Aviation: Alh.  Bashir Dalhatu
Water/Rural Development: Alhaji Isa Mohammed
Works/Housing: Mr. Barnabas Gemade
Chairman, National Planning Commission: Mr. Isaac Aluko-Olokun
Establishment/Management Services: Mr. Innocent Nwoga
States and Local Government Affairs: Alhaji Sule Unguwar Alkali
Secretary to Interim National Government: Alhaji Mustapha Umara
National Assembly Liaison Officer: Alhaji Abba Dabo (House of Representatives) 
National Assembly Liaison Officer: Dr. Samuel Ogboghodo (House of Representatives) 
National Assembly Liaison Officer: Senator George Hoomkwap (Senate)

Notes

Sources

Ernest Shonekan
1993 in Nigeria